Jagakarsa is a district of South Jakarta, one of the administrative cities in Jakarta Indonesia. Jagakarsa is the southernmost district of South Jakarta (the southernmost district of Jakarta belongs to Ciracas District in East Jakarta.) Jagakarsa District is bounded by Ciliwung River to the east, Krukut River to the west, and Margasatwa-Sagu-Joe-T.B.Simatupang-Poltangan Road to the north, while the boundary marches with Depok city to the south.

As one of the southernmost districts of Jakarta, Jagakarsa has a relatively higher elevation (average 52-meter above sea level) and a cooler climate than the rest of Jakarta (average 25–27-degree Celsius). Jagakarsa has been allotted for water reservoir use, resulting in low footprint for buildings in Jagakarsa and high amount of green area.

History

The oldest part of Jagakarsa formed part of the particuliere land or private domain of Tandjong West. Its first recorded owner was Jan Andries Duurkoop, who bought the estate from an unknown prior owner between 1760 and 1780. Duurkoop utilized the estate as grazing land where he kept about five thousand cattle heads, producing milk and meat for the growing urban settlement of Batavia (now Jakarta). Duurkoop died in 1792; and his widow, Johanna Adriana Christina Duurkoop, remarried to Conraag Johnas, then moved to Japan for the latter's military career. The couple later returned to Batavia, where Conraag Johnas died in 1803. The estate of Tandjong West was inherited by descendants of Johanna Adriana Christina Duurkoop in 1838.

By the early twentieth century, the estate of Tandjong West was owned by a company, N. V. Landbouw Maatschappij Tandjong West, headed by the prominent landlord ('landheer') Tan Liok Tiauw, of the late colonial period.

Cultural significance
Jagakarsa contains the northern portion of the complex of University of Indonesia. 

The area is also strongly associated with the local Betawi culture of Jakarta, in particular local music. Various Betawi musical genres that thrive in Jagakarsa include Tanjidor, Tari Topeng, Wayang kulit, Gambus ensemble, and Gambang Kromong. Many Betawi kampungs in the locality are also famous for their rebana ensembles, including in the kelurahan (urban villages) of Jagakarsa, Lenteng Agung, and Tanjung Barat.

Lake Babakan and Lake Mangga Bolong are the largest water reservoirs in Jagakarsa, also functioning as recreation areas. Lake Babakan is particularly known for its Betawi people, who used the edges of the lake for fish-farming.

Kelurahan (Administrative Villages)
The District of Jagakarsa is divided into six kelurahan or administrative villages:
Tanjung Barat – area code 12530
Lenteng Agung – area code 12610
Jagakarsa – area code 12620
Ciganjur – area code 12630
Srengseng Sawah – area code 12640
Cipedak – area code 12630 (separated from Ciganjur Administrative Village)

Rail access
The Bogor-Kota line of Jakarta Commuter rail passed through Jagakarsa District. 

Rail access to the Jagakarsa District, is:

List of important places

ÆON Mall Tanjung Barat
Defunct Rawa Bambu Railway Station. closed in 1996 because of the construction of Jakarta Outer Ring Road section Pondok Pinang – TMII.
Lenteng Agung railway station
National Science and Technology Institute
Northern portion of University of Indonesia
Pancasila University
Situ Babakan or Lake Babakan
Situ Mangga Bolong or Mangga Bolong Lake
Tanjung Barat Tollgate
Tanjung Barat railway station
Tomb of Jagakarsa Prince. Tomb of the local Betawi heroes who defended the area during the 17th century English transitional period. The tomb is sacred for the Betawi people, where the wayang kulit of Betawi is performed during maulid.

References 

Districts of Jakarta
South Jakarta